The 2017–18 Northern Football Alliance consists of 47 teams split over 3 leagues.

Premier Division

Division 1

Division 2

References

Northern Football Alliance